Gubei may refer to:

 Gubei, Jiangxi (古陂镇), town in Xinfeng County
 Gubei, Shanghai (古北), residential area in Changning District
 Gubei Water Town, tourist attraction in Gubeikou Town of Miyun District, Beijing